Jude Ellison Sady Doyle (formerly Sady Doyle; born June 11, 1982) is an American feminist author.

Profile
In 2005, Doyle graduated from Eugene Lang College. 

He founded the blog Tiger Beatdown (a punning reference to Tiger Beat) in 2008. It concluded in 2013. His 2010 critique of Liz Lemon on Tiger Beatdown was oft-cited. Alyssa Rosenberg, writing for ThinkProgress in 2011, criticized Doyle's critique in Tiger Beatdown that year of the sexual violence in Game of Thrones.

Doyle is a feminist author; his first book, titled Trainwreck: The Women We Love to Hate, Mock, and Fear... and Why (2016), dealt with the ways in which society, and especially the media, have built up (and spotlighted) and then torn down women who defied social norms throughout history, particularly by classifying them as "crazy" and "trainwrecks". His second book, Dead Blondes and Bad Mothers: Monstrosity, Patriarchy, and the Fear of Female Power, about patriarchy, monsters, and the horror of being female, was released in August 2019, and deals with the roles women are often pushed into by society, and the ways women are seen as monsters.

He contributed "The Pathology of Donald Trump" to the 2017 anthology Nasty Women: Feminism, Resistance, and Revolution in Trump's America, edited by Samhita Mukhopadhyay and Kate Harding, and the piece “Nowhere Left to Go: Misogyny and Belief on the Left“ to the 2020 anthology Believe Me: How Trusting Women Can Change the World, edited by Jessica Valenti and Jaclyn Friedman, as well as contributing to Rookie - Yearbook One (2012), Rookie - Yearbook Two (2014), and The Book of Jezebel: An Illustrated Encyclopedia of Lady Things (2013). Doyle also edited and wrote the introduction for Marilyn Monroe: The Last Interview: and Other Conversations (2020).

He was a staff writer for In These Times and Rookie, and has also written for other outlets including The Guardian, Elle, The Atlantic, and NBCNews.com.

Doyle has written extensively about sexual assault and the misogynistic abuse that many women face online, which Doyle has also endured.

In 2020, he published the teenage horror comedy Apocalypse 1999 Or The Devil in Jenny Long, offering it as a free download via the book's website.

He wrote the comic MAW, which was a five-issue horror series, the last issue of which came out in January of 2022. The comic was released by BOOM! Studios.

His piece “The Healed Body”, about In My Skin, is part of the anthology It Came from the Closet: Queer Reflections on Horror, published on October 4, 2022.

He also worked on the libretto for the musical Queen of Hearts, about Martin Bashir’s interview with Diana, Princess of Wales; the musical premiered October 20, 2022.

Social media activities 
In 2010, Doyle started the #MooreandMe campaign against Michael Moore's rejection of rape allegations made about Julian Assange. In 2011, Doyle started the hashtag #mencallmethings as a way to further discussion of sexist abuse received by women writers on the Internet. The same year, Doyle received the first Women's Media Center Social Media Award. In 2013, Kurt Metzger feuded with Doyle and Lindy West via Facebook and Twitter during a defense of rape humor.

Personal life 
Doyle is bisexual, non-binary, and transgender, and uses he/him and they/them pronouns.

He has stated that he was sexually assaulted. He has said his father was abusive and almost killed him, his mother, and his brother. Doyle has mentioned having post-traumatic stress disorder.

Doyle has a husband and a daughter. He also has a brother, who he has stated has schizophrenia.

Notes

References

External links 
 
 Tiger Beatdown

1982 births
21st-century American writers
American feminist writers
Bisexual feminists
American bisexual writers
Eugene Lang College alumni
Living people
Non-binary writers
People with post-traumatic stress disorder
Transgender writers
Transgender non-binary people
Transgender men
Bisexual men
Bisexual non-binary people